No Nonsense is the 22nd solo studio album by American country artist Barbara Mandrell. The album was released on August 21, 1990 on Capitol Records and was produced by Jimmy Bowen. It was the second studio album Mandrell released in 1990 as well as her third release for the Capitol label.

Background and content 
No Nonsense was recorded in July 1990 and was Mandrell's second studio release of 1990. The album's musical style was mainly approached from a traditional country music style and varies from ballads to uptempo material. The opening track "Where Are the Pieces of My Heart" was one of two songs written by songwriter Hugh Prestwood, who also wrote Trisha Yearwood's "The Song Remembers When" in 1993. Prestwood also wrote "More Fun Than the Law Allows". The fifth track "I'd Rather Be Used (Than Not Needed at All)" was a duet with Barbara's sister, Louise, and was written by Louise's then-husband, R.C. Bannon. No Nonsense was released on a compact disc upon its release in 1990. The album received two and a half out of five stars by Allmusic without a review provided.

Release 
No Nonsense spawned three singles between 1990 and 1991, but none of the singles charted the Billboard Magazine Hot Country Singles & Tracks chart or the Canadian RPM Country Tracks chart. The debut single "Men and Trains" was released in 1990, followed by "I'll Leave Something Good Behind" and "Feed the Fire" in 1991. No Nonsense was released August 21, 1990 and peaked for one week at #72 on the Billboard Magazine Top Country Albums chart. It became Mandrell's lowest-peaking album.

Around the time of the album's release, Mandrell was featured in a series of TV commercials and print ads for No Nonsense pantyhose, some of which were used to cross-promote the No Nonsense album.

Track listing 
 "Where Are the Pieces of My Heart" – (Hugh Prestwood)
 "Feed the Fire" – (Ava Aldridge, Jan Buckingham)
 "Too Soon to Tell" – (Mike Reid, Rory Bourke)
 "Straight and Narrow" (Monty Powell, Michael Noble)
 "I'd Rather Be Used (Than Not Needed at All)" – (R.C. Bannon)
 duet with Louise Mandrell
 "More Fun Than the Law Allows" – (Hugh Prestwood)
 "You Gave It to Me" (Will Jennings, Curtis Wright)
 "Men and Trains" (R. C. Bannon)
 "We Can't Go Back" (R. C. Bannon, Gail Farrell)
 "I'll Leave Something Good Behind" – (Hilary Kanter)

Personnel 
 Eddie Bayers – drums
 Larry Byrom – guitar
 Steve Allen Davis – background vocals
 Paul Franklin – synthesizer
 Dann Huff – guitar
 John Barlow Jarvis – piano
 Barbara Mandrell – lead vocals
 Randy McCormick – synthesizer
 Michael Rhodes – bass
 Lisa Silver – background vocals
 Chris Waters – synthesizer
 Curtis Young – background vocals
 Liana Young – background vocals
 Reggie Young – guitar

Chart positions

References 

1990 albums
Barbara Mandrell albums
Albums produced by Jimmy Bowen
Capitol Records albums